Pakubuwono VIII (the other name's Bandara Radin Mas Kuseini)(also transliterated Pakubuwana VIII) (born 20 April 1789 –  ruled 1858 until 28 December 1861) was the eighth Susuhunan (ruler of Surakarta) from 1858 to 1861. He was the elder brother of Pakubuwano VII.

References
Miksic, John N. (general ed.), et al. (2006)  Karaton Surakarta. A look into the court of Surakarta Hadiningrat, central Java (First published: 'By the will of His Serene Highness Paku Buwono XII'. Surakarta: Yayasan Pawiyatan Kabudayan Karaton Surakarta, 2004)  Marshall Cavendish Editions  Singapore  

Burials at Imogiri
Susuhunan of Surakarta
1789 births
1861 deaths
Indonesian royalty